Georgia Arianna, Lady Colin Campbell (née Ziadie, born 17 August 1949), also known as Lady C, is a British Jamaican author, socialite, and television personality who has published seven books about the British royal family. They include biographies of Diana, Princess of Wales, which was on The New York Times Best Seller list in 1992, Queen Elizabeth The Queen Mother, and Meghan, Duchess of Sussex.

Born into the Ziadie family, a prominent family of Lebanese descent, she grew up in the Colony of Jamaica as the child of a wealthy department store owner. Campbell was born with a genital malformation and, following the medical advice of that time, was raised as a boy despite being female. She moved to New York City to attend the Fashion Institute of Technology and began working as a model. In 1970 she had corrective surgery for her congenital vaginal malformation, funded by her grandmother. She legally changed her name from George William Ziadie to Georgia Arianna Ziadie, receiving a new birth certificate. While in the United States, she met and married Lord Colin Ivar Campbell, the second son of Ian Campbell, 11th Duke of Argyll and Louise Hollingsworth Morris Clews. The marriage quickly soured and they divorced nine months later following a scandal surrounding her gender at birth, with Campbell accusing her husband of selling a false story that she had a sex change to the papers. 

As well as being a royal biographer, Campbell is a television personality who has made appearances on Comedy Nation, I'm a Celebrity...Get Me Out of Here!, Celebs Go Dating, Salvage Hunters, Through the Keyhole, Good Morning Britain, and Celebs on the Farm. She is the châtelaine of Castle Goring in Worthing, the ancestral seat of the Shelley baronets, which she runs as a wedding venue and event space.

Early life
Campbell was born in Jamaica on 17 August 1949 as George William Ziadie, one of four children of department store owner Michael George Ziadie and Gloria Dey (née Smedmore). She said in a interview that her father was a Russian count and that she is thus a Russian countess in her own right and has stated that her family descends from Charlemagne and William the Conqueror. Campbell is a cousin of opera director Sir Peter Jonas.

At birth, she had a genital malformation (a fused labia and deformed clitoris). Medical advice at the time was to assign her as a male so that she could live what was deemed a normal life, as what was thought of at that time as "the superior sex". Though her family life was otherwise happy, Ziadie has since spoken and written of the many personal issues she faced being raised as a boy when she is biologically female.

Her family, the Ziadies, were prominent in Jamaica after emigrating from Lebanon, having grown wealthy from trade. Campbell moved from Jamaica to New York City to attend the Fashion Institute of Technology. She was not able to have the corrective surgery needed for her congenital vaginal malformation until 1970 when she was 21, when her grandmother discovered what had occurred and gave her the $5,000 she needed. At that time, Ziadie legally changed her name from George William Ziadie to Georgia Arianna Ziadie and received a new birth certificate. "No one ever faced the knife more eagerly than I. You would have thought I was going on a wonderful cruise – which, in a way, I suppose I was," Ziadie wrote in her autobiography. She had already started working as a model in New York City prior to her surgery.

Marriage and family
On 23 March 1974, after having known him for only five days, she married Lord Colin Ivar Campbell, the younger son of the eleventh Duke of Argyll. She has said of him, "He had the strongest personality of anyone I had ever met – he simply exuded strength, decisiveness and charm." However, their relationship quickly soured. The couple split after nine months over the scandal surrounding her gender at birth, and divorced after 14 months. She successfully sued several publications that claimed she was born a boy and had subsequently undergone a sex change, and accused her former husband of selling the untrue story for money. Her stepmother-in-law was Margaret Campbell, Duchess of Argyll, who was friends with Dame Barbara Cartland, step-grandmother to Princess Diana.

In 1993, she adopted two Russian boys, Michael ‘Misha’ and Dimitri ‘Dima’, both of whom appeared on MTV's 2018 reality television show The Royal World calling themselves "Count".

In 2013, she bought Castle Goring, the ancestral home of the family of the poet Percy Bysshe Shelley (although he never lived there), and a Grade I listed country house in Worthing, Sussex.

Writing career

Campbell wrote special Radio pantomimes for the BBC in 1982 and 1983, entitled Dick Whittington and Sleeping Beauty. She is best known for her books on Diana, Princess of Wales, and Queen Elizabeth The Queen Mother. Her 1992 book, Diana in Private: The Princess Nobody Knows, provided information about Diana's struggle with bulimia and her affair with James Hewitt (insights into these matters deriving from the fact that "one of [Campbell's] closest friends was one of [Diana's] closest friends"). Campbell was dismissed as a fantasist, but some of her claims were later vindicated. Diana in Private appeared on The New York Times Best Seller list in 1992. Campbell later claimed that the book initially started as an authorised official biography but later Diana decided to make it an unofficial one and use it as a "get out of jail card" after being "advised by friends that she should play the victim."

Campbell's 2012 book, The Untold Life of Queen Elizabeth The Queen Mother, was met with criticism. Her theorising, including claims quoting the Duke of Windsor regarding the Queen Mother's parentage, was dismissed by writers Hugo Vickers and Michael Thornton as "bizarre" and "complete nonsense". The timing of the publication of Campbell's book, a service of remembrance for the Queen Mother marking the tenth anniversary of her death, was also condemned. In The Sunday Times, the journalist Lynn Barber opined that Campbell's claims ought not to be dismissed out of hand. In The Independent, reviewing Campbell's The Royal Marriages, Barber had described her pleasure in encountering "an author so exhilaratingly untrammelled by any fear (or knowledge?) of the libel laws. Nothing is beyond her", concluding "either (Campbell) is the greatest gossip since Pepys or she is a complete fabulist: one can only read it and gawp... Lady Colin Campbell never bothers her head with anything so tedious as verification".

In 2020, Campbell released another biography called Meghan and Harry: The Real Story, addressing Meghan and Prince Harry's life, romance and ensuing rift with the Royal Family. Her other books include a book about her own mother titled Daughter of a Narcissus: A Family's Struggle to Survive their Mother's Narcissistic Personality Disorder, and a book about Queen Elizabeth II titled The Queen's Marriage. Campbell has been called a "polarizing figure" by Vanity Fair and an "amusing dinner partner" by Tina Brown.

Television
Campbell appeared on Comedy Nation, a British TV show. In November 2015, she took part in the fifteenth TV series of I'm a Celebrity...Get Me Out of Here!. The following month, she left the programme before its conclusion "on medical grounds". In a later interview, Campbell said that she felt bullied into leaving the show by Tony Hadley and Duncan Bannatyne.

In 2016, she featured in a documentary entitled Lady C and the Castle, which was broadcast by ITV. The programme charted her journey in converting her dilapidated castle into a wedding venue. In 2017 she appeared at the castle in an episode of Salvage Hunters on Quest. She also appeared on Through the Keyhole, where Keith Lemon toured Castle Goring.

In August 2019, Campbell appeared on Celebs Go Dating, shown on E4.

In November of that year she appeared on Good Morning Britain to defend Prince Andrew, Duke of York's associations with Jeffrey Epstein, who had been convicted of soliciting a 17-year-old female named Virginia Roberts for prostitution. She said that Epstein was not a paedophile but an ephebophile, and argued that there is a material difference between "a minor and a child" (no legal difference exists where Epstein was convicted). She reiterated this defence on the launch of GB News in June 2021. She subsequently sued the Daily Mirror after the newspaper accused her in an article of defending "Jeffrey Epstein's right to rape children".

In early 2021, she competed in the MTV series Celebs on the Farm.

Selected publications
 
 
 
 
 
  (Autobiography)
 
  (Withdrawn after legal threats from Lily Safra and subsequently reissued in 2008 with amendments)
  (Autobiography, profile of her mother)
  (Ghostwritten by the author on behalf of her dog)

References

External links

Living people
1949 births
20th-century British women writers
20th-century English writers
20th-century Jamaican writers
21st-century British women writers
21st-century English novelists
British autobiographers
British biographers
British socialites
British women novelists
Clan Campbell
English biographers
English people of Lebanese descent
English people of Irish descent
English people of Jewish descent
English people of Portuguese descent
English people of Spanish descent
Jamaican people of British descent
Jamaican people of English descent
Jamaican people of Irish descent
Jamaican people of Lebanese descent
Jamaican people of Spanish descent
Jamaican female models
Jamaican women writers
Jamaican writers
Wives of younger sons of peers
Women autobiographers
Women biographers
Fashion Institute of Technology alumni
I'm a Celebrity...Get Me Out of Here! (British TV series) participants